Steven Kunes (born 1956) is an American conman and former screenwriter. He has been convicted of felony commercial burglary and grand theft by false pretenses.

Early life and education 
Kunes was born in 1956 in Bucks County, Pennsylvania. He graduated in 1974 from Neshaminy High School, and attended college at New York University.

Career
Kunes' IMDb page claims writing credits for an episode of the TV show The Love Boat and a TV movie Alvin Goes Back to School, as well as various roles as an "uncredited creative consultant", but it has been heavily edited and redacted. At various times he has claimed to have written Johnny Carson's final monologue, worked on a Harry Potter film, and written the biopic Catch Me If You Can. In 2011, Kunes wrote a number of guest commentaries that were published by Santa Barbara media outlets. It was eventually discovered that they had largely been plagiarized from Newsweek columns and they were removed from websites.

With Norman Lear, Kunes co-wrote a pilot TV episode for NBC in August 1984 called P.O.P. about a "lovable con artist" and he was a writer on two single-season sitcoms, a.k.a. Pablo in 1984 on ABC and Marblehead Manor in 1987-88.

Kunes sold the screenplay First Comes Love for $1.2 million in 1992, though no film was made.

Kunes is a member of the Writers Guild of America, West, the Authors Guild, the Dramatists Guild, and PEN America.

Legal issues
In 1982, Kunes attempted to sell to People magazine an interview with reclusive author J. D. Salinger, whom he claimed he had met. Salinger sued and settled the case under the conditions that Kunes was "permanently enjoined from representing by any means that he is associated with Salinger", barred from "exhibiting, transmitting or exhibiting documents, writing or statements attributed to Salinger" and "required to collect and turn over any such documents or writings for destruction".  The interview was never published. He later succeeded in selling a fake interview with Jimmy Buffett to the Santa Barbara Daily Sound.

Kunes was arrested on March 17, 2011, for purportedly swindling his friend, former Café Buenos Aires owner Wally Ronchietto, out of $2,000 for a nonexistent movie deal. On April 23, 2011, Noozhawk, a Santa Barbara online publication, announced that it had removed six of Kunes' articles from its digital archives as two contained plagiarized passages.

On August 27, 2011, a Santa Barbara judge issued a $200,000 bench warrant for his arrest when he failed to appear in court. Thought to have been hiding in Bucks County, he was apprehended in New Jersey less than a month later. 

At court, Kunes pleaded guilty and admitted to forging checks. 
On May 4, 2012, he was sentenced to five years in jail for felony commercial burglary and grand theft by false pretenses. A plea deal allowed for a sentence of only four years if Kunes had paid restitution to his victims, but no payments were made.
In February 2013, Kunes was re-arrested. He had been serving his five-year sentence and had been approved for electronic monitoring on August 1, 2012. Kunes removed the device on August 22, 2012, and mailed the device back to the Santa Barbara County Sheriff's Office. A photo posted on the Sheriff's Office Facebook page led to his identification at a Carpinteria cafe and his subsequent arrest. He was released from prison in June 2015 but arrested again for violating the terms of his probation after falsely telling the Bucks County Courier Times that he was producing a Netflix series called Over My Dead Body.

Bibliography
Four on the Four: Four Plays
Uncle Jerry to Win (a novel)
Pick Six: Six Screenplays

References

External links

Steven Kunes on IMDb

1956 births
Living people
New York University alumni
People from Bucks County, Pennsylvania
Writers from Los Angeles
Writers from Pennsylvania
American fraudsters